Thunder Bay National Marine Sanctuary and Underwater Preserve is a United States National Marine Sanctuary on Lake Huron's Thunder Bay, within the northeastern region of the U.S. state of Michigan. It protects an estimated 116 historically significant shipwrecks ranging from nineteenth-century wooden side-wheelers to twentieth-century steel-hulled steamers.
7 of the wrecks are listed on the National Register of Historic Places.

Shipwrecks within the sanctuary

See also
List of Great Lakes shipwrecks on the National Register of Historic Places
List of shipwrecks in the Great Lakes

External links
Sanctuary homepage

References

Shipwrecks
Thunder Bay National Marine Sanctuary
Steam barges